Catharanthus lanceus grows as a perennial herb up to  tall. Its fragrant flowers feature white or cream corolla lobes turning pink, reddish-violet or pink-magenta. Vernacular names for the plant include "lance-leaf periwinkle". Its habitat is on volcanic or burned soil, hillside rocks and in open woodland on ridges. Catharanthus lanceus is found from  altitude. The plant is used in local medicinal treatments for toothache, fever and skin diseases, and also as a diuretic. The species is endemic to Madagascar.

References

lanceus
Plants used in traditional African medicine
Endemic flora of Madagascar
Plants described in 1844
Taxa named by Wenceslas Bojer
Taxa named by Alphonse Pyramus de Candolle
Taxa named by Marcel Pichon